Laura Adani (7 October 1913 – 30 August 1996) was an Italian actress. She appeared in 13 films between 1933 and 1980.

She was born in Modena, Emilia-Romagna, Italy and died in Moncalieri, Piedmont.

Filmography

External links

1913 births
1996 deaths
Italian film actresses
Film people from Modena
20th-century Italian actresses